The Carrie Pierce House is a historic house in Madison, Wisconsin, United States that is listed on the National Register of Historic Places

Description
The -story house is located at 424 North Pinckney Street.

History
The residence was completed in 1857 and was originally built for Alexander A. McDonnell. Later occupants of the house include U.S. Representative Orasmus Cole before it was eventually purchased by George and Carrie Pierce. In 1971, it was designated a landmark by the Madison Landmarks Commission.

It was added to the National Register of Historic Places on October 18, 1972.

See also

 National Register of Historic Places listings in Madison, Wisconsin

References

External links

Houses in Madison, Wisconsin
Houses completed in 1857
Houses on the National Register of Historic Places in Wisconsin
National Register of Historic Places in Madison, Wisconsin
1857 establishments in Wisconsin